Euan Graeme Crowther Stubbs (born 23 April 1978) is a Scottish radiologist and former first-class cricketer.

Stubbs was born at Glasgow in April 1978. He was educated at The Glasgow Academy, before matriculating to the University of Edinburgh. A club cricketer for Watsonians, he was selected in the Scotland under-19 team for the 1998 Under-19 Cricket World Cup in South Africa, making six Youth One Day International appearances in the competition. The following year, he made a single first-class appearance for the senior Scottish team against Ireland at Belfast. Playing as a wicket-keeper in the side, he was twice unbeaten in the match with scores of 7 and 14, in addition to taking 3 catches behind the stumps. By 2010, Stubbs was acting captain at Watsonians, and the following year he took a one-year sabbatical from playing to spend a year in Canada on a medical fellowship at McMaster University.

References

External links
 

1978 births
Living people
Cricketers from Glasgow
People educated at the Glasgow Academy
Alumni of the University of Edinburgh
Scottish cricketers
21st-century Scottish medical doctors
British radiologists
Academic staff of McMaster University
Scottish expatriates in Canada